Blanchard Island is an island in the Mississippi River between the U.S. states of Illinois and Iowa at . Most of the island lies within Drury Township, in Rock Island County, but its southern extremity lies in Eliza Township, Mercer County. The island is one of the more popular recreation sites along the Upper Mississippi River between Petosi, Wisconsin, and Saverton, Missouri.

References

External links
Rock Island County, Illinois (IL) at city-data.com
Rock Island County, Illinois Islands at HomeTownLocator.com.

River islands of Illinois
Landforms of Mercer County, Illinois
Landforms of Rock Island County, Illinois
Islands of the Mississippi River